Mount Achala is a peak rising to 680 m at the north end of Telefon Ridge, Deception Island, in the South Shetland Islands. It was named by the Argentine Antarctic Expedition in 1956, after a mountain in Argentina.

References
 SCAR Composite Antarctic Gazetteer.

Mountains of the South Shetland Islands
Geography of Deception Island